Ayed is an Arabic surname. Notable people with this surname include:

 Anouar Ayed (born 1978), Tunisian handball player
 Hamdi Ayed (born 1993), Qatari handball player
 Lotfi Ayed (born 1959), Swedish boxer
 Makrem Ayed (born 1973), Tunisian judoka
 Mohammed Ali Ayed, Emirati footballer
 Mohsen Ayed, Yemeni human rights activist
 Mraljeb Ayed Mansoor (born 1939), Kuwaiti long-distance runner
 Nahlah Ayed, Canadian  journalist
 Rajaei Ayed, Jordanian footballer
 Momo Ayed (1957-2022), Belgian football manager